Kärlek & uppror (Love and Uprising) is the second album by Swedish punk band Ebba Grön, first released in 1981. The album was recorded and mixed at Mistlur Studio, December 1980 - February 1981.

Aftonbladet rewarded this album with Rockbjörnen 1981.

Track listing

References

1981 albums
Ebba Grön albums